Sara Choi (born 25 June 2003) is a South Korean para-alpine skier. She competes in the B2 category, which is for visually impaired athletes.

Career 
Choi competed at the 2021 World Para Snow Sports Championships held in Lillehammer, Norway, winning the bronze medal in the downhill and super combined events.

She represented South Korea at the 2022 Winter Paralympics held in Beijing, China.

References 

2003 births
Living people
South Korean female alpine skiers
Visually impaired category Paralympic competitors
South Korean blind people
Alpine skiers at the 2022 Winter Paralympics
Paralympic alpine skiers of South Korea